Weatherford is a city in Custer County, Oklahoma, United States.  The population was 10,833 at the 2010 census.

Geography
Weatherford is located at  (35.5384097, -98.6872467). The elevation is 1,634 feet (498 m).

History 
Situated on land made available to homesteaders as part of the Cheyenne-Arapaho Opening on April 19, 1892, Weatherford was incorporated on August 3, 1898, on a townsite location chosen by banking and civic leader Beeks Erick.  By 1900, the town's population was 1,017.  The town's original post office was located approximately two miles north of town, on William John and Lorinda Powell Weatherford's homestead.  Lorinda Weatherford served as its postmaster and namesake.  In its early years, farming and ranching provided the major economic base, with corn, cotton, and maize the major crops.  Additionally, a brick plant, a cement plant, and a broom factory provided jobs as well as supplies for early residents.

Demographics

As of the census of 2015, there were 12,126 people, 3,991 households, and 2,187 families residing in the city. The population density was 1,699.3 people per square mile (656.3/km). There were 4,468 housing units at an average density of 770.1 per square mile (297.4/km). The racial makeup of the city was 73.7% White, 4.9% African American, 2.3% Native American, 1.4% Asian, 0.03% Pacific Islander, 1.76% from other races, and 6.6% from two or more races. Hispanic or Latino of any race were 10.8% of the population.

There were 3,991 households, out of which 25.8% had children under the age of 18 living with them, 42.5% were married couples living together, 9.0% had a female householder with no husband present, and 45.2% were non-families. 31.6% of all households were made up of individuals, and 8.3% had someone living alone who was 65 years of age or older. The average household size was 2.27 and the average family size was 2.96.

In the city, the population was spread out, with 19.8% under the age of 18, 32.1% from 18 to 24, 22.4% from 25 to 44, 16.2% from 45 to 64, and 9.4% who were 65 years of age or older. The median age was 24 years. For every 100 females age 18 and over, there were 91.2 males.
The median income for a household in the city was $26,908, and the median income for a family was $41,401. Males had a median income of $29,683 versus $20,833 for females. The per capita income for the city was $16,046. About 11.8% of families and 21.7% of the population were below the poverty line, including 19.1% of those under age 18 and 11.8% of those age 65 or over.

Economy
Kodak's 50-year old manufacturing plant in Weatherford was subject to a $15 million expansion in 2017 related to flexographic packaging plates.   

Weatherford is a hub for multiple oil and natural gas industry leaders such as Oneok Field Services and Chesapeake Energy, as well as a location for wind power production.

Attractions

The  Stafford Air & Space Museum is home to the Gemini 6A spacecraft, an actual Titan II missile, WWII V-2 rocket, Saturn V F-1 engine as well as flown space suits, flight equipment, Space Shuttle engines, and a Moon rock.  Aircraft displays include an actual Sopwith Pup, F-86, F-104, T-33, T-38, F-16, and a rare MIG-21, as well as full-scale replicas of the Wright Flyer, Bleriot and Spirit of St. Louis.  Weatherford is the hometown of astronaut Thomas P. Stafford, veteran of four space flights and commander of the Gemini 9, Apollo 10 missions and the Apollo–Soyuz project.  The museum is located at the Thomas P. Stafford Airport.

Weatherford also has The Oklahoma Heartland of America Museum, which opened in 2007.   The 12,000 square foot building contains many artifacts from the late 1800s through the 1950s in thirty-two major historical exhibits, including a 1931 Model A Ford sports coupe, and features three historic theme buildings (diner, school house, and blacksmith's shop) on the museum grounds.

The City of Weatherford has twelve parks containing over eight hundred acres, including Heritage Park, across from City Hall, which displays a wind turbine blade for close inspection.

 
Weatherford has four NRHP-listed sites including the Owl Blacksmith Shop at 208 W. Rainey.

Education
At the turn of the 20th century, Weatherford beat out several other cities vying to become the home to Southwestern Oklahoma State University (SWOSU), at the time known as Southwestern Oklahoma State College. Founded in 1901, it was first known as Southwestern State Teachers College. SWOSU became the largest institute of higher education in Western Oklahoma, with more than 4,200 undergraduates and post graduates by 2015.  SWOSU is placed in Tier 2 of the "Regional Universities (West)" category in the 2016 edition of the U.S. News & World Report Education Rankings and offers associate, bachelor's, master's and professional doctorate degree programs.  It is one of two universities in the state that feature an accredited school of pharmacy.

Parochial schools in the area include ACSI accredited Western Oklahoma Christian School, which has campuses in Weatherford, as well as nearby Clinton and Elk City, serving grades pre-kindergarten through six.  Corn Bible Academy, located in the Washita County town of Corn, serves students in grades seven through twelve.

Weatherford Public Schools provides public education services to the city of Weatherford as well as surrounding rural areas in southeastern Custer and northeastern Washita counties. The district operates three elementary schools, one middle school, and one high school.

Western Technology Center (WTC) provides the opportunity for adults and high school students to get occupationally-specific training. Weatherford Public Schools is a member of the WTC district.  As a member of the WTC district, high school juniors and seniors living in the Weatherford School District have the opportunity to attend classes at WTC.  High school students who are residents of the WTC District can enroll in WTC full-time training on a tuition-free basis.  Adult students are allowed to attend classes on a tuition basis.

Wind Energy

Weatherford is home to the wind power facility called the Weatherford Wind Energy Center, with 98 GE 1.5 MW Wind Turbines, for a total nameplate capacity of 147 MW.

Transportation
Weatherford was, for many years, situated on a main line of the now defunct Rock Island Railroad, which is still in operation by a different owner. With the advent of the automobile, the city was initially located on State Highway 3 starting in the early 1920s, which was redesignated as U.S. Route 66 in 1926 and paved entirely across Western Oklahoma by 1932. Route 66, which followed Main Street through the city, was lined with various tourist businesses including cafes, motels and gasoline stations like most other cities along the highway. Several blocks of Main Street were also paved in brick until the mid-1950s when it was widened to a four-lane thoroughfare.
Interstate 40 was completed east and west of the city in 1960 generally paralleling the old U.S. 66 alignment, which was retained as frontage road. The I-40 bypass skirting Weatherford to the south was completed in July, 1970 the same day the I-40 bypass was opened to traffic  to the west at Clinton and followed shortly thereafter by bypasses at Elk City and Sayre.
In addition to Route 66 and I-40, Weatherford is also served by north–south State Highway 54.

The Thomas P Stafford Airport (KOJA; FAA ID: OJA), two miles northeast of town, features a 5100’ x 75’ paved runway.

Notable people
 
 Jeff Banister – Manager of the Texas Rangers (baseball) 
 Brett Chapman – Attorney and advocate for Native American civil rights
 Paul D. Eaton – U.S. Army Major General (retired), former commanding general in Iraq
 Gordon Friesen – writer
 Cliff Keen – head wrestling coach at University of Michigan from 1925–1970
 Braden Looper – Major League Baseball pitcher
 James C. Nance – Oklahoma community newspaper chain publisher and former Speaker of the Oklahoma House of Representatives, President pro tempore of the Oklahoma Senate and member Uniform Law Commission
 Wes Sims – Professional Football Player
 Thomas P. Stafford – Astronaut, orbited the Moon on Apollo 10
 Stanley Vestal – Author of the American Old West

References

External links
 City of Weatherford
 Encyclopedia of Oklahoma History and Culture

Cities in Custer County, Oklahoma
Cities in Oklahoma

fr:Weatherford